Chuck Cooper (born November 8, 1954) is an American actor. He won the 1997 Tony Award for Best Performance by a Featured Actor in a Musical for his performance as the pimp Memphis in The Life.

Career 
Cooper made his Broadway debut in 1983 in the musical Amen Corner, playing the role of Brother Boxer. He was an understudy in the original Broadway casts of his next three shows: Someone Who'll Watch Over Me (he eventually took over the role of Adam), Passion, and Getting Away with Murder.

Cooper won the Tony Award for Best Performance by a Featured Actor in a Musical for his performance as the pimp Memphis in the 1997 Broadway production of the musical The Life.

Cooper has also appeared in Chicago as Billy Flynn, Caroline, or Change as the dual role of The Bus and The Dryer, and Finian's Rainbow as Bill Rawkins, as well as benefit performances of Hair and A Wonderful Life. In February 2010 he was the narrator in the U.S. premiere of Seven Scenes from Hamlet, by the Spanish composer Benet Casablancas, at the Miller Theatre in Manhattan.

In 2015, Cooper appeared on Broadway as the slave Thomas in the new musical Amazing Grace, at the Nederlander Theatre. The musical is about John Newton, the redeemed slave-trader who wrote the hymn "Amazing Grace". In 2021, he returned for the Broadway debut production of Alice Childress's 1955 play Trouble in Mind, at Roundabout Theatre Company's American Airlines Theatre. For this performance, he has been nominated for the Tony Award for Best Featured Actor in a Play.

Personal life 
Cooper has three children—Eddie, Alex, and Lilli—from his first marriage. His son Eddie has performed on television and on stage. In May 2009, Cooper and playwright Deborah Brevoort were married in Carmel, New York, after almost ten years of dating. Their initial meeting and eventual engagement were covered in a New York Times website video.

References

External links 
 
 
 
 
 TonyAwards.com "Tony Memory" interview with Chuck Cooper

1954 births
Living people
American male film actors
American male musical theatre actors
African-American male actors
Male actors from Cleveland
Tony Award winners
20th-century American male actors
21st-century American male actors
20th-century African-American male singers
21st-century African-American people